Cayo Caiman Grande de Santa María Lighthouse is a Cuban lighthouse located in Cayo Santa María, a resort island of the municipality of Caibarién, Villa Clara Province.

See also
 List of lighthouses in Cuba
 Cayo Fragoso Lighthouse

References

Lighthouses in Cuba
Buildings and structures in Villa Clara Province
Lighthouse Cayo Caiman Grande de Santa Maria
Lighthouses completed in 1909
Lighthouses completed in 1955
20th-century architecture in Cuba